Joseph Francis Benda (March 20, 1905 – June 20, 1950) was an American football, basketball and baseball coach.
He served three stints head football coach at Saint John's University in Collegeville, Minnesota, from 1930 to 1936, 1941 to 1942, and 1945 to 1949, compiling a record of 57–32–8. Benda was also the school's head basketball coach and head baseball coach.

Benda played college football at the University of Notre Dame in South Bend, Indiana, lettering three years from 1925 to 1927. He came St. John's after spending a year as the head coach at his old high school, leading Central to a 7–1 finish in 1929. He inherited a Johnnies' squad that finished 0–6 the year before. St. John's finished 1–4–1 in 1930, including an 82–0 loss at St. Olaf.

Benda died on June 20, 1950, in Collegeville, after suffering from Hodgkin's lymphoma.

Head coaching record

College football

References

External links
 Pro Football Archives profile

1905 births
1950 deaths
American football ends
Cleveland Rams coaches
Notre Dame Fighting Irish football coaches
Notre Dame Fighting Irish football players
Saint John's Johnnies athletic directors
Saint John's Johnnies baseball coaches
Saint John's Johnnies basketball coaches
Saint John's Johnnies football coaches
High school football coaches in Minnesota
Sportspeople from Duluth, Minnesota
Coaches of American football from Minnesota
Players of American football from Duluth, Minnesota
Basketball coaches from Minnesota
Baseball coaches from Minnesota
Deaths from cancer in Minnesota
Deaths from Hodgkin lymphoma